Plav Municipality (Montenegrin) is one of the municipalities of Montenegro. The center is Town of Plav. In February 2014, the south-western third of the municipality seceded to form Gusinje Municipality.

Geography
Plav is located at the foot of the Accursed mountains range, adjacent to the springs of the river Lim. The area contains many lakes and the most known is Lake Plav, one of the largest in this region. The lakes Hrid and Visitor are mountain lakes, and Visitor is noted for its floating island. Plav is also renowned for its karst wells, among which are Ali Pasha of Gucia Springs and Oko Skakavica.

Settlements
Plav Municipality is divided into 5 communes (mjesna zajednica) with 22 settlements (naselje). Plav Municipality communes:
Brezojevice commune (Brezojevice), Plav commune (Plav, Babino Polje, Bogajiće, Budojevice, Jara, Jasenica, Komorača, Korita, Meteh, Đurička Rijeka, Hakanje, Hoti, Skić and Vojno Selo), Murino commune (Murino, Gornja Ržanica, Mašnica and Pepići), Prnjavor commune (Prnjavor), Velika commune: Velika and Novšiće).

Local parliament

Demographics
Town of Plav is administrative centre of Plav Municipality, which in 2011 had a population of 9,081. The town of Plav itself has 3,717 citizens.

 
Population history:
1948 - 15,764
1953 - 17,330
1961 - 18,913
1971 - 19,542
1981 - 19,560
1991 - 19,305
2003 - 13,805
2011 - 13,108

Gallery

References 

 
Municipalities of Montenegro